is a Japanese rock band formed in Hokkaido in 2010. The band consists of five members: Ryome, Kyosuke, Romantic Yasuda, Kobori Fire and Taichi Thunder.

History
2011-2013
The five members formed Bakudan Johnny in high school. During the summer break of their last year in high school, they went on a nationwide tour with fellow Hokkaido band, Drop's.

2014
Bakudan Johnny made their major debut on April 23 with the album, はじめての爆弾ジョニー(Hajimete no Bakudan Johnny).
Two tie-ups further increased the band's recognition around the nation. The first was 唯一人 (Tada Hitori), which was released on June 4 and used as the theme song for the anime, Ping Pong. The second tie-up was with the movie, Hibi Rock. Bakudan Johnny's single, 終わりなき午後の冒険者(Owarinaki Gogo no Boukensha), was chosen as the theme song for this comedy

Discography

Singles

Albums

References

External links 
 
 Bakudan Johnny official Facebook

Japanese rock music groups
2010 establishments in Japan
Toy's Factory artists
Musical groups from Hokkaido
Musical groups established in 2010